This was the first edition of the tournament.

Mikhail Elgin and Divij Sharan won the title after defeating Ivan and Matej Sabanov 6–3, 6–0 in the final.

Seeds

Draw

References
 Main Draw

Bengaluru Open - Doubles
2017 Doubles